Epipocinae is a subfamily of handsome fungus beetles in the family Endomychidae. There are at least 4 genera and more than 40 described species in Epipocinae.

Genera
These four genera belong to the subfamily Epipocinae:
 Anidrytus Gerstaecker, 1858
 Ephebus Chevrolat in Dejean, 1836
 Epipocus Germar, 1843
 Epopterus Chevrolat in Dejean, 1836

References

Further reading

 
 
 
 
 
 

Endomychidae
Articles created by Qbugbot